Watari may refer to:

Places
Watari District, Miyagi, Japan
Watari, Miyagi, town in Watari District
 Watari Station (Miyagi), train station in Watari District
 Watari Station (Kumamoto), train station in Kumamoto Prefecture, Japan
 Watari Museum of Contemporary Art in Tokyo, Japan

People
Given name
Watari Handa (1911–1948), Japanese fighter pilot

Surname
Daiki Watari (born 1993), Japanese football player
Hiroshi Watari (born 1963), Japanese singer
Rio Watari (born 1991), Japanese wrestler
Tetsuya Watari (born 1941), Japanese film, stage and television actor
Wataru Watari (born 1987), Japanese light novel author

Fictional characters
Watari (Death Note), a character in the manga series Death Note

Japanese-language surnames